was a junior college in Nagano, Nagano, Japan.

The junior college was founded in 1950 by Nagano Prefecture. The predecessor of the school was founded in 1929. It became coeducational in 2004. It became a 4-year university in April 2018 called The University of Nagano.

References

External links
 

Universities and colleges in Nagano Prefecture
Nagano (city)
Educational institutions established in 1950
Japanese junior colleges
1950 establishments in Japan